Rick Germanson (born May 29, 1972) is an American jazz pianist from Milwaukee, Wisconsin.

Career
Germanson started playing piano at a young age. After winning the grand prize at the American Pianists Association's Jazz Piano Competition in 1996, Germanson left Milwaukee for New York City.

Since 2001, Germanson has been a member of the Cannonball Legacy Band headed by Louis Hayes, who was a drummer for Cannonball Adderley. He has toured with Pat Martino's tribute to Wes Montgomery.

He has worked with Elvin Jones Regina Carter, Tom Harrell, Slide Hampton, Frank Morgan, Eric Alexander, Frank Lacy, Marlena Shaw, Donald Harrison, Brian Lynch, Jim Rotondi, Charles McPherson, Charles Davis, Craig Handy, Cecil Payne,   George Gee, Gerald Hayes, Joe Magnarelli, Ian Hendrickson-Smith, and Gerald L. Cannon.

Since 2014 Rick has been professor of Jazz Piano at The Jackie McLean Institute, Hartt School of Music at The University of Hartford.

Discography 
 Heights (Fresh Sounds, 2003)
 You Tell Me (Fresh Sounds, 2005)
 Off the Cuff (Owl, 2009)
 Live at Smalls (Smallslive, 2011)
 Turquoise Twice (WJ3, 2019)

References 

1972 births
Living people
Musicians from Milwaukee
21st-century American male musicians
21st-century American pianists
American jazz bandleaders
American jazz composers
American jazz pianists
American male pianists
American male jazz composers
Owl Studios artists
WJ3 Records artists